Charlie Johnston (13 November 1875 – 28 August 1950) was a former Australian rules footballer who played with Melbourne in the Victorian Football League (VFL).

His brother Jack also played football with Melbourne.

Notes

External links 

Charlie Johnston on Demonwiki

1875 births
1950 deaths
Australian rules footballers from Victoria (Australia)
Melbourne Football Club players
South Bendigo Football Club players